Muricauda ruestringensis is a bacterium. It is a facultatively anaerobic, appendaged bacterium first isolated from the North Sea. Its nearest relative is Zobellia uliginosa. The type strain is strain B1T (= DSM 13258T = LMG 19739T).

References

Further reading

Ludwig, Wolfgang, Jean Euzéby, and William B. Whitman. "Road map of the phyla Bacteroidetes, Spirochaetes, Tenericutes (Mollicutes), Acidobacteria, Fibrobacteres, Fusobacteria, Dictyoglomi, Gemmatimonadetes, Lentisphaerae, Verrucomicrobia, Chlamydiae, and Planctomycetes." Bergey's Manual® of Systematic Bacteriology. Springer New York, 2010. 1–19.

External links
Type strain of Muricauda ruestringensis at BacDive -  the Bacterial Diversity Metadatabase

Flavobacteria
Bacteria described in 2001